This is a list of notable paleontologists who have made significant contributions to the field of paleontology.  Only paleontologists with biographical articles in Wikipedia are listed here.

A

 Othenio Abel (Austria, 1875-1946)
 William Abler (United States)
 Karel Absolon (Czech Republic, 1877-1960)
 Louis Agassiz (Switzerland / United States, 1807-1873)
 Emiliano Aguirre (Spain, 1925-2021)
 Per E. Ahlberg (Sweden)
 Gustava Aigner (Austria, 1906-1987)
 Luis Alcalá (Spain)
 Truman H. Aldrich (United States, 1848-1932)
 Richard Aldridge (England, 1945-2014)
 Annie Montague Alexander (Kingdom of Hawaii / United States, 1867-1950)
 John Alroy (United States / Australia, 1966- )
 Vladimir Prokhorovich Amalitskii (Russia, 1860-1917)
 Carlos Ameghino (Argentina, 1865-1936)
 Florentino Ameghino (Argentina, 1854-1911)
 Charles Anderson (Scotland / Australia, 1876-1944)
 Elaine Anderson (United States, 1936-2002)
 Johan Gunnar Andersson (Sweden, 1874-1960)
 Gábor Andreánszky (Hungary, 1895-1967)
 Charles William Andrews (England, 1866-1924)
 Henry Nathaniel Andrews (United States, 1910-2002)
 Mahala Andrews (Scotland, 1939-1997)
 Roy Chapman Andrews (United States, 1884-1960)
 Nicolai Ivanovich Andrusov (Russia, 1861-1924)
 Alberto Angela (Italy, 1962- )
 Ernesto Pérez d'Angelo (Chile, 1932-2013)
 Mary Anning (England, 1799-1847)
 Miguel Telles Antunes (Portugal, 1937- )
 Esther Applin (United States, 1895-1972)
 Camille Arambourg (France, 1885-1969)
 Edward Alexander Newell Arber (England, 1870-1918)
 Adolphe d'Archiac (France, 1802-1868)
 William Joscelyn Arkell (England, 1904-1958)
 Chester A. Arnold (United States, 1901-1977)
 Juan Luis Arsuaga (Spain, 1954- )
 Berhane Asfaw (Ethiopia)
 Hermann Martin Asmuss (Estonia, 1812-1859)
 Sava Athanasiu (Romania, 1861-1946)
 Walter Auffenberg (United States, 1928-2004)
 Stanley Awramik (United States, 1946- )

B

 Catherine E. Badgley (United States)
 William Hellier Baily (England, 1819-1888)
 Andrew Geddes Bain (South Africa, 1797-1864)
 Robert T. Bakker (United States, 1945- )
 Jean-Christophe Balouet (France, 1956-2021)
 Harlan Parker Banks (United States, 1913-1998)
 Mário Costa Barberena (Brazil, 1934-2013)
 Erwin Hinckly Barbour (United States, 1856-1947)
 Joachim Barrande (France, 1799-1883)
 Charles Barrois (France, 1851-1939)
 Rinchen Barsbold (Mongolia, 1935- )
 Ray S. Bassler (United States, 1878-1961)
 Dorothea Bate (England, 1878-1951)
 Francis Arthur Bather (England, 1863-1934)
 Georg Baur (United States, 1859-1898)
 George Bax Holmes (England, 1803-1887)
 Allan Bé (United States, died 1983)
 William Bean (England, 1787-1866)
 K. Christopher Beard (United States)
 William Beard (England, 1772-1868)
 Samuel Beckles (England, 1814-1890)
 Charles Emerson Beecher (United States, 1856-1904)
 Hermann Behmel (Germany, 1939- )
 Kay Behrensmeyer (United States)
 Walter A. Bell (Canada, 1889-1969)
 Romeu Beltrão (Brazil, 1913-1977)
 Etheldred Benett (England, 1776-1845)
 Michael Benton (Scotland, 1956- )
 Georg Karl Berendt (Germany, 1790-1850)
 Wolfgang H. Berger (Germany / United States, 1937-2017)
 Annalisa Berta (United States)
 Charles Eugène Bertrand (France, 1851-1917)
 Paul Bertrand (France, 1879-1944)
 Heinrich Ernst Beyrich (Germany, 1815-1896)
 Gertruda Biernat (Poland, 1923-2016)
 Peter von Bitter (Canada)
 Alexander Bittner (Austria, 1850-1902)
 Hans C. Bjerring (Sweden, 1931- )
 Philip R. Bjork (United States)
 Richard S. Boardman (United States, 1923-2011)
 Birger Bohlin (Sweden, 1898-1990)
 Johannes Böhm (Germany, 1857-1938)
 José Bonaparte (Argentina, 1928-2020)
 Matthew Bonnan (United States)
 Lieuwe Dirk Boonstra (South Africa, 1905-1975)
 Pramatha Nath Bose (India, 1855-1934)
 Marcellin Boule (France, 1861-1942)
 Michael Boulter (England, 1942- )
 James Scott Bowerbank (England, 1797-1877)
 Henry Bowman Brady (England, 1835-1891)
 Charles Kimberlin Brain (South Africa)
 Wilhelm von Branca (Germany, 1844-1928)
 Leonard R. Brand (United States, 1941- )
 Martin Brasier (England, 1947-2014)
 Auguste Bravard (France, 1803-1861)
 William J. Breed (United States, 1928-2013)
 Stoycho Vassilev Breskovski (Bulgaria, 1934-2004)
 Derek Briggs (Ireland / United States, 1950- )
 Mitja Brodar (Slovenia, 1921-2012)
 Srečko Brodar (Slovenia, 1893-1987)
 Pierce Brodkorb (United States, 1908-1992)
 Magnus Bromelius (Sweden, 1679-1731)
 Adolphe-Théodore Brongniart (France, 1801-1876)
 Heinrich Georg Bronn (Germany, 1800-1862)
 Robert Broom (Scotland / South Africa, 1866-1951)
 Barnum Brown (United States, 1873-1963)
 Michel Brunet (France, 1940- )
 Stephen L. Brusatte (United States, 1984-)
 Christian Leopold von Buch (Germany, 1774-1853)
 Walter Hermann Bucher (Germany / United States, 1888-1965)
 Mary Buckland (England, 1797-1857)
 William Buckland (England, 1784-1856)
 Sydney Savory Buckman (England, 1860-1929)
 Graham Budd (England, 1968- )
 Oliver Bulman (England, 1902-1974)
 Emanuel Bunzel (Austria, 1828-1895)
 George Busk (England, 1807-1886)
 Charles Butts (United States, 1863-1946)
 Alexey Bystrow (Russia / Soviet Union, 1899-1959)

C

 Susan Cachel (United States)
 André Cailleux (France, 1907-1986)
 Jaci Antonio Louzada Tupi Caldas (Brazil, 1898-1946)
 Mary Gordon Calder (Scotland, 1906-1992)
 Jorge O. Calvo (Argentina, 1961- )
 Adriaan Gilles Camper (Netherlands, 1759-1820)
 Gustave Campiche (Switzerland, 1809-1871)
 Ferdinand Canu (France, 1863-1932)
 Giovanni Capellini (Italy, 1833-1922)
 Eudald Carbonell (Spain, 1953- )
 Daniel Cargnin (paleontologist) (Brazil, 1930-2002)
 Kenneth Carpenter (Japan, 1949- )
 Robert L. Carroll (United States, 1938-2020)
 Rodolfo Casamiquela (Argentina, 1932-2008)
 Ermine Cowles Case (United States, 1871-1953)
 Meemann Chang (China, 1936- )
 Frederick Chapman (England / Australia, 1864-1943)
 Wilfrid Chapman (England, 1891-1955)
 Alan Charig (England, 1927-1997)
 Edward Charlesworth (England, 1813-1893)
 Sankar Chatterjee (United States)
 James Chatters (United States, 1949- )
 Alan Cheetham (United States, 1928- )
 Feodosy Chernyshov (Russia, 1856-1914)
 Luis M. Chiappe (Argentina)
 Karen Chin (United States)
 Anusuya Chinsamy-Turan (South Africa)
 Henry Christy (England, 1810-1865)
 Jenny Clack (England, 1947-2020)
 T. H. Clark (Canada, 1893-1996)
 John Mason Clarke (United States, 1857-1928)
 Preston Cloud (United States, 1912-1991)
 Grigore Cobălcescu (Romania, 1831-1892)
 Alberto Cobos (Spain)
 Edwin Harris Colbert (United States, 1905-2001)
 Desmond H. Collins (Canada)
 Fabio Colonna (Italy, 1567-1640)
 William Conybeare (England, 1787-1857)
 Isabel Clifton Cookson (Australia, 1893-1973)
 Edward Drinker Cope (United States, 1840-1897)
 Rodolfo Coria (Argentina, 1959- )
 Shirley Coryndon (1926-1976)
 Maurice Cossmann (France, 1850-1924)
 Joseph Pitty Couthouy (United States, 1808-1864)
 Carlos de Paula Couto (Brazil, 1910-1982)
 Leslie Reginald Cox (England, 1897-1965)
 Henry Crampton (United States, 1875-1956)
 Carl Hermann Credner (Germany, 1841-1913)
 Irene Crespin (Australia, 1896-1980)
 Walter Drawbridge Crick (England, 1857-1903)
 Margaret Crosfield (England, 1859-1952)
 Osvaldo Rodrigues da Cunha (Brazil, 1930-2011)
 Ethel Currie (Scotland, 1899-1901)
 Philip J. Currie (Canada, 1949- )
 Kristina Curry Rogers (United States)
 Georges Cuvier (France, 1769-1832)
 Jan Czerski (Poland, 1845-1892)

D

 Ted Daeschler (United States)
 Anne Dambricourt-Malassé (France, 1959- )
 Wilhelm Dames (Germany, 1843-1898)
 Robert Damon (England, 1814-1889)
 Thomas Davidson (Scotland, 1817-1885)
 A. Morley Davies (England)
 William Davies (England, 1814-1891)
 John William Dawson (Canada, 1820–1899)
 Mary R. Dawson (United States)
 Henry De la Beche (England, 1796-1855)
 Tao Deng (China, 1963- )
 Charles Depéret (France, 1854-1929)
 Peter Dodson (United States)
 Louis Dollo (France / Belgium, 1857-1931)
 Dong Zhiming (China, 1937- )
 Philip Donoghue (England)
 Stephen Donovan (England, 1954- )
 François Doumergue (France, 1858-1938)
 Joseph Henri Ferdinand Douvillé (France, 1846-1937)
 Eugène Dubois (Netherlands, 1858-1940)
 Émilien Dumas (France, 1804-1873)
 William Sutherland Dun (Australia, 1868-1934)
 Carl Owen Dunbar (United States, 1891-1979)
 Peter Martin Duncan (England, 1824-1891)
 Wilhelm Dunker (Germany, 1809-1885)
 David Dunkle (United States, 1911-1984)
 Gareth J. Dyke (Ireland)

E
 Tilly Edinger (Germany / United States, 1897-1967)
 Dianne Edwards (England, 1942- )
 Sir Philip Grey Egerton, 10th Baronet (England, 1806-1881)
 Niles Eldredge (United States, 1943- )
 Andrzej Elżanowski (Poland, 1950- )
 Ashton F. Embry (Canada, 1946- )
 Cesare Emiliani (Italy / United States, 1922-1995)
 Douglas Emlong (United States, 1942-1980)
 Hermann Friedrich Emmrich (Germany, 1815-1879)
 Michael S. Engel (United States, 1971- )
 Bruce Erickson (United States, 1933-2022)
 Gregory M. Erickson (United States)
 Gundolf Ernst (Germany, 1930-2002)
 Douglas Erwin (United States)
 Kirill Eskov (Russia, 1956- )
 Robert Etheridge (England, 1819-1903)
 Robert Etheridge, Junior (England / Australia, 1847-1920)
 Constantin von Ettingshausen (Austria, 1826-1897)
 Eugène Eudes-Deslongchamps (France, 1830-1889)
 Jacques Amand Eudes-Deslongchamps (France, 1794-1867)
 Susan E. Evans (England)

F
 Hugh Falconer (Scotland, 1808-1865)
 Paul Fallot (France, 1889-1960)
 Mikhail Fedonkin (Russia, 1946- )
 Franz Nopcsa von Felső-Szilvás (Hungary, 1877-1933)
 Carroll Lane Fenton (United States, 1900-1969)
 Mildred Adams Fenton (United States, 1899-1995)
 Egidio Feruglio (Italy, 1897-1954)
 Harold John Finlay (New Zealand, 1901-1951)
 Clive Finlayson (Gibraltar, 1955- )
 Geraldine Finlayson (Gibraltar)
 Anthony Fiorillo (United States)
 Paul Henri Fischer (France, 1835-1893)
 Gotthelf Fischer von Waldheim (Germany, 1771-1853)
 Tim Flannery (Australia, 1956- )
 Rousseau H. Flower (United States, 1913-1988)
 August Foerste (United States, 1862-1936)
 Michael Foote (United States, 1963- )
 Edward Forbes (Isle of Man, 1815-1854)
 Carlo Fornasini (Italy, 1854-1931)
 Mikael Fortelius (Finland, 1954- )
 Catherine Forster (United States)
 Clive Forster-Cooper (England, 1880-1947)
 Richard Fortey (England, 1946- )
 William Parker Foulke (United States, 1816-1865)
 William Fox (England, 1813-1881)
 Eberhard Fraas (Germany, 1862-1915)
 Georgii Frederiks (Russia / Soviet Union, 1889-1938)
 Childs Frick (United States, 1883-1965)
 Antonin Fritsch (Czech Republic, 1832-1913)
 Karl von Fritsch (Germany, 1838-1906)
 Michael Frogley (United Kingdom)

G

 William More Gabb (United States, 1839-1878)
 Eugene S. Gaffney (United States)
 Peter Galton (England, 1942- )
 Taiping Gao (China, 1984- )
 Kenneth Garrett (United States, 1953- )
 Bartolomeo Gastaldi (Italy, 1818-1879)
 Charles-Théophile Gaudin (Switzerland, 1822-1866)
 Jean Albert Gaudry (France, 1827-1908)
 Sabine Gaudzinski-Windheuser (Germany, 1965- )
 Jacques Gauthier (United States)
 Charles Lewis Gazin (United States, 1904-1995)
 Henry Gee (England, 1962- )
 Ross Geller (United States)
 Paul Gervais (France, 1816-1879)
 James W. Gidley (United States, 1866-1931)
 Christoph Gottfried Andreas Giebel (Germany, 1820-1881)
 Edmund Dwen Gill (Australia, 1908-1986)
 David Gillette (United States)
 Charles W. Gilmore (United States, 1874-1945)
 Philip D. Gingerich (United States, 1946- )
 George Herbert Girty (United States, 1869-1939)
 Bernard du Bus de Gisignies (Netherlands / Belgium, 1808-1874)
 Martin Glaessner (Austria-Hungary / Australia, 1906-1989)
 Ludwig Glauert (England / Australia, 1879-1963)
 Ernst Friedrich Glocker (Germany, 1793-1858)
 Pascal Godefroit (Belgium)
 Georg August Goldfuss (Germany, 1782-1848)
 Heinrich Göppert (Germany, 1800-1884)
 Mackenzie Gordon, Jr. (United States, 1913–1992)
 Maria Gordon (Scotland, 1864–1939)
 Dragutin Gorjanović-Kramberger (Croatia, 1856-1936)
 Stephen Jay Gould (United States, 1941-2002)
 David J. Gower (England)
 Amadeus William Grabau (United States / China, 1870-1946)
 Walter W. Granger (United States, 1872-1941)
 Bruno Granier (France)
 Richard E. Grant (United States, 1927-1995)
 Vadim Gratshev (Soviet Union / Russia, 1963-2006)
 Joseph T. Gregory (United States, 1914-2007)
 William King Gregory (United States, 1876-1970)
 Amanz Gressly (Switzerland, 1814-1865)
 David Grimaldi (United States, 1957- )
 Vera Gromova (Russia / Soviet Union, 1891-1973)
 Walter R. Gross (Germany, 1903-1974)
 Józef Grzybowski (Poland, 1869-1922)

H
 George Haas (Austria, 1905-1981)
 Julius von Haast (Germany, 1822-1887)
 Jules Haime (France, 1824-1856)
 James Hall (United States, 1811-1898)
 Valerie Hall (Ireland)
 Anthony Hallam (England, 1933-2017)
 Beverly Halstead (England, 1933-1991)
 David Harper (England)
 Tom Harris England)
 John Bell Hatcher ([United States, 1861-1904)
 Sidney H. Haughton (England / South Africa, 1888-1982)
 Oliver Perry Hay (United States, 1846-1930)
 Angelo Heilprin (United States, 1853-1907)
 Anatol Heintz (Norway, 1898-1975)
 Natascha Heintz (Norway, 1930- )
 Sam W. Heads (England, 1983- )
 Oswald Heer (Switzerland, 1809-1883)
 Gerhard Heilmann (Denmark, 1859-1946)
 Sue Hendrickson (United States, 1949- )
 Edwin Hennig (Germany, 1882-1977)
 Gunnar Henningsmoen (Norway, 1919-1996)
 Victoria Herridge (England)
 Franz Martin Hilgendorf (Germany, 1839-1904)
 Edward Hitchcock (United States, 1793-1864)
 Scott Hocknull (Australia)
 Ove Arbo Høeg (Norway, 1898-1993)
 Johann Leonard Hoffmann (Netherlands, 1710-1782)
 Hans J. Hofmann (Germany / Canada, 1936-2010)
 William Jacob Holland (United States, 1848-1932)
 J. Alan Holman (United States, 1931-2006)
 Keith Holmes (Australia)
 Thomas R. Holtz, Jr. (United States, 1965- )
 Dave Hone (United States)
 Dirk Albert Hooijer (Netherlands, 1919-1993)
 Reginald Hooley (England, 1865-1923)
 James Hopson (United States, 1935- )
 Jack Horner (United States, 1946- )
 Moritz Hornes (Austria, 1815-1868)
 Lukas Hottinger (Switzerland, 1933-2011)
 Nicholas Hotton III (United States, 1920/21-1999)
 Hildegarde Howard (United States, 1901-1998)
 Friedrich von Huene (Germany, 1875-1969)
 Alois Humbert (Switzerland, 1829-1887)
 Julian P. Hume (England, 1960- )
 Jean Jacques Nicolas Huot (France, 1790-1845)
 Pierre Hupé (France, 1907-2003)
 Jørn Hurum (Norway, 1967- )
 Thomas Henry Huxley (England, 1825-1895)
 Alpheus Hyatt (United States, 1838-1902)

I
 Nizar Ibrahim (Germany / Morocco, 1982- )
 Thomas Image (England, 1772-1856)
 Wataru Ishijima (Japan, 1906-1980)
 Arturo Issel (Italy, 1842-1922)

J
 David Jablonski (United States, 1953- )
 Auguste Jaccard (Switzerland, 1833-1895)
 Louis L. Jacobs (United States, 1948- )
 Sohan Lal Jain (India)
 Helen F. James (United States, 1956- )
 Werner Janensch (Germany, 1878-1969)
 Philippe Janvier (France)
 Erik Jarvik (Sweden, 1829-1901)
 Dick Jefferies (England)
 Farish Jenkins (United States, 1940-2012)
 James A. Jensen (United States, 1918-1998)
 Kirk Johnson (United States, 1960- )
 Frederik Johnstrup (Denmark, 1818-1894)
 Theobald Jones (Ireland, 1790-1868)
 Thomas Rupert Jones (England, 1819-1911)

K
 Josephine Kablick (Czech Republic, 1787-1863)
 Myra Keen (United States, 1905-1986)
 Gerta Keller (Switzerland / United States, 1945- )
 Alexander Kellner (Brazil, 1961- )
 Remington Kellogg (United States, 1892-1969)
 Doris Kermack (England, 1923-2003)
 Kenneth Kermack (England, 1919-2000)
 Andre Keyser (South Africa, 1938-2010)
 Alexander Keyserling (Russia, 1815-1891)
 Johan Aschehoug Kiær (Norway, 1869–1931)
 Zofia Kielan-Jaworowska (Poland, 1925-2015)
 Caitlín R. Kiernan (United States, 1964- )
 Kamoya Kimeu (Kenya, 1940- )
 William King (Ireland / England, 1809-1886)
 James Kirkland (United States, 1954- )
 James Kitching (South Africa, 1922-2003)
 Andrew H. Knoll (United States, 1959- )
 Gustav Heinrich Ralph von Koenigswald (Germany / Netherlands, 1902-1982)
 Anastas Kondo (Albania, 1937-2006)
 Laurent-Guillaume de Koninck (Belgium, 1809-1887)
 Andreas Kornhuber (Austria, 1824-1905)
 Vladimir Kovalevsky (Russia, 1842-1883)
 Roman Kozłowski (Poland, 1889-1977)
 Jaroslav Kraft (Czech Republic, 1940-2007)
 Miklós Kretzoi (Hungary, 1907-2005)
 Afrikan Nikolaevich Krishtofovich (Russia, 1885-1953)
 Evgeny Kurochkin (Russia, 1940-2011)
 Sergei Kurzanov (Russia, 1947- )
 Björn Kurtén (Finland, 1924-1988)
 Nikolai Yakovlevich Kuznetsov (Russia, 1873-1948)

L
 Philippe de La Harpe (Switzerland, 1830-1882)
 Kenneth Lacovara (United States)
 Matt Lamanna (United States)
 Lawrence Lambe (Canada, 1863-1919)
 Charles Lamberton (France, 1876-1960)
 Kálmán Lambrecht (Hungary, 1889-1936)
 Archibald Lamont (Scotland, 1907-1985)
 Wann Langston, Jr. (United States, 1921-2013)
 Jia Lanpo (China, 1908-2001)
 Albert-Félix de Lapparent (France, 1905-1975)
 Peter Larson (United States, 1952- )
 Édouard Lartet (France, 1801-1871)
 Louis Lartet (France, 1840-1899)
 Gustav Karl Laube (Germany / Czech Republic, 1839-1923)
 Charles Léopold Laurillard (France, 1783-1853)
 Michel Laurin (Canada)
 René Lavocat (France)
 Louise Leakey (Kenya, 1972- )
 Richard Leakey (Kenya, 1944–2022)
 Alfred Nicholson Leeds (England, 1847-1917)
 Serge Legendre (France)
 Joseph Leidy (United States, 1823-1891)
 André Leroi-Gourhan (France, 1911-1986)
 Don Lessem (United States, 1951- )
 Riccardo Levi-Setti (Italy, 1927-2018)
 Giancarlo Ligabue (Italy, 1931-2015)
 Venceslau de Sousa Pereira de Lima (Portugal, 1858-1919)
 Jere H. Lipps (United States, 1939- )
 Martin Lockley (England)
 Alfred R. Loeblich Jr (United States, 1914-1994)
 Helen Niña Tappan Loeblich (United States, 1917-2004)
 John A. Long (Australia, 1957- )
 Albert Heber Longman (England / Australia, 1880-1954)
 Jane Longstaff (England, 1855-1935)
 William Lonsdale (England, 1794-1871)
 Frederic Brewster Loomis (United States, 1873-1937)
 Perceval de Loriol (Switzerland, 1828-1908)
 Lü Junchang (China, 1965–2018)
 Spencer G. Lucas (United States)
 R. S. Lull (United States, 1867-1957)
 Peter Wilhelm Lund (Denmark / Brazil, 1801-1880)
 Tyler Lyson (United States)

M
 James "Jim" Henry Madsen Jr. (United States, 1932-2009)
 Evgeny Maleev (Soviet Union, 1915-1966)
 Mirko Malez (Croatia, 1924-1990)
 Francesco Mallegni (Italy)
 V. Standish Mallory (United States, 1919-2003)
 Gideon Mantell (England, 1790-1852)
 Alexander V. Markov (Russia, 1965- )
 Brian John Marples (England / New Zealand, 1907-1997)
 Othniel Charles Marsh (United States, 1831-1899)
 Anthony J. Martin (United States)
 Larry Martin (United States, 1943-2013)
 Paul S. Martin (United States, 1928-2010)
 William Martin (England, 1767-1810)
 Nieves López Martínez (Spain, 1949-2010)
 Andrey Vasilyevich Martynov (Russia, 1879-1938)
 John Marwick (New Zealand, 1891-1978)
 Teresa Maryańska (Poland)
 Octávio Mateus (Portugal, 1975- )
 William Diller Matthew (United States, 1871-1930)
 Vratislav Mazák (Czech Republic, 1937-1987)
 J. C. McConnell (United States, 1844-1904)
 Frederick McCoy (Ireland / Australia, 1817-1899)
 Malcolm McKenna (United States, 1930-2008)
 Mark McMenamin (United States)
 Fielding Bradford Meek (United States, 1817-1876)
 Felipe Mendez (Argentina, 1897-?)
 Peter Merian (Switzerland, 1795-1883)
 John Campbell Merriam (United States, 1869-1945)
 Jean-Louis Hardouin Michelin de Choisy (France, 1786-1867)
 John Samuel Miller (England, 1779-1830)
 Pierre-Aimé Millet (France, 1783-1873)
 Angela Milner (England)
 Dick Mol (Netherlands, 1955- )
 Neale Monks (England, 1971- )
 Raymond C. Moore (United States, 1892-1974)
 John Morris (England, 1810-1886)
 Simon Conway Morris (England, 1951- )
 J.A. Moy-Thomas (England, 1908-1944)
 Salvador Moyà-Solà (Spain, 1955- )
 Benjamin Franklin Mudge (United States, 1817-1879)
 Atílio Munari (Brazil, 1901-1941)
 Francisco Javier Muñiz (Argentina, 1795-1871)
 Dmitrii Mushketov (Russia, 1882-1938)

N
 Darren Naish (England, 1975- )
 Alfred Gabriel Nathorst (Sweden, 1850-1921)
 Theodor Anton Neagu (Romania, 1932-2017)
 Sterling Nesbitt (United States, 1982- )
 Edwin Tulley Newton (England, 1840-1930)
 Elizabeth Nicholls (Canada, 1946-2004)
 Henry Alleyne Nicholson (Scotland, 1844-1899)
 Adolf Carl Noé (Austria / United States, 1873-1939)
 Alexander von Nordmann (Finland, 1803-1866)
 Mark Norell (United States, 1957- )
 David B. Norman (England)
 Fernando Novas (Argentina)
 Nestor Ivanovich Novozhilov (Russia)

O
 Vladimir Obruchev (Russia, 1863-1956)
 Klaus Oeggl (Austria, 1955- )
 Chonosuke Okamura (Japan)
 Thomas Oldham (Ireland / England, 1816-1878)
 Walter Oliver (Australia / New Zealand, 1883-1957)
 Paul E. Olsen (United States, 1953- )
 Stanley John Olsen (United States, 1919-2003)
 Everett C. Olson (United States, 1910-1993)
 Armin Öpik (Estonia / Australia, 1898-1983)
 Alcide d'Orbigny (France, 1802-1857)
 Yuri Alexandrovich Orlov (Russia, 1893-1966)
 Tor Ørvig (Sweden, 1916-1994)
 Henry Fairfield Osborn (United States, 1857-1935)
 Halszka Osmólska (Poland, 1930-2008)
 John Ostrom (United States, 1928-2005)
 Richard Owen (England, 1804-1892)
 Katsura Ōyama (Japan, 1917-1995)

P
 Kevin Padian (United States, 1951- )
 Miquel Crusafont i Pairó  (Spain, 1910-1983)
 Allison R. Palmer (United States, 1927- )
 C. Phil Palmer (England)
 Katherine Van Winkle Palmer (United States, 1895–1982)
 Heinz Christian Pander (Russia, 1794-1865)
 James Parkinson (England, 1755-1824)
 William Parks (Canada, 1868-1936)
 Bryan Patterson (England / United States, 1909-1979)
 Colin Patterson (England, 1933-1998)
 Gregory S. Paul (United States, 1954- )
 Alexei Petrovich Pavlov (Russia, 1854-1929)
 Maria Pavlova (Russia, 1854-1938)
 Rajko Pavlovec (Slovenia, 1932-2013)
 Frank Peabody (United States, 1914-1958)
 Pei Wenzhong (China, 1904-1982)
 David P. Penhallow (United States / Canada, 1854-1910)
 Ernesto Pérez d'Angelo (Chile, 1932–2013)
 Altangerel Perle (Mongolia, 1945- )
 Jaroslav Perner (Czech Republic, 1869-1947)
 Léon Pervinquière (France, 1873-1913)
 Luigi Piacenza (Italy, 1935-2009)
 Josef Ladislav Píč (Czech Republic, 1847-1911)
 Martin Pickford (England / Kenya)
 Elizabeth Philpot (England, 1780-1857)
 Guy Ellcock Pilgrim (England, 1875-1943)
 Irajá Damiani Pinto (Brazil, 1919-2014)
 Edna P. Plumstead (South Africa, 1903-1989)
 P. David Polly (United States / United Kingdom)
 Auguste Pomel (France, 1821-1898)
 Yuri Alexandrovich Popov (Russia, 1936-2016)
 Jean-François-Albert du Pouget (France, 1818-1904)
 Vicentino Prestes de Almeida (Brazil, 1900-1954)
 Llewellyn Ivor Price (Brazil, 1905-1980)
 Donald Prothero (United States, 1954- )
 Mark Purnell (England)

Q
 Heinrich Quiring (Germany, 1883-1964)

R
 Anton Ramovš (Slovenia, 1924-2011)
 Alexandr Rasnitsyn (Russia)
 Guilherme Rau (Brazil, ?-1953)
 David M. Raup (United States, 1933-2015)
 Emily Rayfield (England)
 Manfred Reichel (Switzerland, 1896-1984)
 Osvaldo Reig (Argentina, 1929-1992)
 Roy Herbert Reinhart (United States, 1919-2005)
 Zeev Reiss (Israel, 1917-1996)
 Robert R. Reisz (Canada, 1947- )
 Bernard Renault (France, 1836-1904)
 Eugène Renevier (Switzerland, 1831-1906)
 Charles Repenning (United States, 1922-2005)
 Charles E. Resser (United States, 1889-1943)
 Gregory Retallack (United States, 1951- )
 August Emanuel von Reuss (Austria, 1811-1873)
 Emma Richter (Germany 1888-1956)
 Armand de Ricqlès (France, 1938-1963)
 Elmer S. Riggs (United States, 1869-1963)
 François Jules Pictet de la Rive (Switzerland, 1809-1872)
 John T. Robinson (South Africa, 1923-2001)
 Boris Rohdendorf (Russia, 1904-1977)
 Josef Victor Rohon (Austria, 1845-1923)
 Alfred Romer (United States, 1894-1973)
 Marcus R. Ross (United States, 1976- )
 Claudia Roth (France)
 Santiago Roth (Switzerland / Argentina, 1850-1924)
 Rafael Royo-Torres (Spain)
 Anatoly Konstantinovich Rozhdestvensky (Russia, 1920-1983)
 John Ruben (United States)
 Rudolf Ruedemann (United States, 1864-1956)
 Bruce Runnegar (Australia, 1941- )
 Dale Russell (Canada / United States, 1937-2019)
 Marcello Ruta (Italy)
 Vasiliy E. Ruzhentsev (Russia, 1899-1978)
 Natalia Rybczynski (Canada)

S

 Karol Sabath (Poland, 1963-2007)
 John William Salter (England, 1820-1869)
 Scott D. Sampson (Canada, 1961- )
 William J. Sanders (United States)
 Ivan Sansom (Wales)
 Gaston de Saporta (France, 1823-1895)
 Henri Émile Sauvage (France, 1842-1917)
 R. J. G. Savage (UK, 1927-1998)
 Gunnar Säve-Söderbergh (Sweden, 1910-1948)
 Steven Schafersman (United States)
 Viera Scheibner (Slovakia, 1935- )
 Johann Jakob Scheuchzer (Switzerland, 1672-1733)
 Judith Schiebout (United States)
 Erich Maren Schlaikjer (United States, 1905-1972)
 Philippe-Charles Schmerling (Netherlands / Belgium, 1790-1836)
 Robert M. Schoch (United States)
 J. William Schopf (United States, 1941- )
 Frederick Schram (United States, 1943- )
 Charles Schuchert (United States, 1858-1942)
 Mary Higby Schweitzer (United States)
 William Berryman Scott (United States, 1858-1947)
 Samuel Hubbard Scudder (United States, 1837-1911)
 Harry Seeley (England, 1839-1909)
 Adolf Seilacher (Germany, 1925-2014)
 Brigitte Senut (France, 1954–)
 Jack Sepkoski (United States, 1948-1999)
 Paul Sereno (United States, 1957- )
 Ethel Shakespear (England, 1871-1946)
 Nathaniel Shaler (United States, 1841-1906)
 Aleksandr Grigorevich Sharov (Russia)
 Charles Davies Sherborn (England, 1861-1942)
 Neil Shubin (United States, 1960- )
 Christian Sidor (United States)
 Gloria Jean Siebrecht (United States, 1940- )
 Ion Th. Simionescu (Romania, 1873-1944)
 George Gaylord Simpson (United States, 1902-1984)
 Martin I. Simpson (England)
 Christopher P. Sloan (United States, 1954- )
 M. Paul Smith (England)
 Boris Sergeyevich Sokolov (Russia, 1914-2013)
 Leonard Frank Spath (England, 1882-1957)
 Zdeněk Špinar (Czech Republic, 1916-1995)
 Robert Masterman Stainforth (England, 1915-2002)
 Herbert F. Standing (Madagascar)
 Steven M. Stanley (United States, 1941- )
 Hans Georg Stehlin (Switzerland, 1870-1941)
 Erik Stensiö (Sweden, 1891-1984)
 Charles Hazelius Sternberg (United States, 1850-1943)
 Charles Mortram Sternberg (United States / Canada, 1885-1981)
 Kaspar Maria von Sternberg (Czech Republic, 1761-1838)
 Charles Stokes (England, 1780s-1853)
 Ferdinand Stoliczka (Austria / Czech Republic, 1838-1874)
 Henry Stopes (England, 1852-1902)
 Marie Stopes (England, 1880-1958)
 Antonio Stoppani (Italy, 1824-1891)
 Leif Størmer (Norway, 1905-1979)
 J. Willis Stovall (United States, 1891-1953)
 George William Stow (England / South Africa, 1822-1882)
 Ernst Stromer (Germany, 1871-1952)
 Samuel Stutchbury (England, 1798-1859)
 Hans-Dieter Sues (United States)
 Robert M. Sullivan (United States, 1951- )
 William Elgin Swinton (Scotland / Canada)
 Władysław Szajnocha (Poland, 1857-1928)

T
 Mignon Talbot (United States, 1869-1950)
 Darren Tanke (Canada, 1960- )
 Philippe Taquet (France, 1940- )
 Paul Tasch (United States, 1910-2001)
 Leonid Petrovich Tatarinov (Russia, 1926-2011)
 Ian Tattersall (England / United States, 1945- )
 Juan Tavera (Chile, 1917-1991)
 Mike P. Taylor (England, 1968- )
 Richard H. Tedford (United States, 1929-2011)
 Curt Teichert (Germany / United States, 1905-1996)
 Pierre Teilhard de Chardin (France, 1881-1955)
 Geneviève Termier (France, 1917-2005)
 Henry Testot-Ferry (France, 1826-1869)
 Nicolas Théobald (France, 1903-1981)
 Robert C. Thorne (United States, 1898-1960)
 Raymond Thorsteinsson (Canada, 1921-2012)
 Richard A. Thulborn (England)
 Bruce H. Tiffney (United States)
 Eduard Toll (Russia)
 Zsófia Torma (Hungary, 1832-1899)
 Ramsay Traquair (Scotland, 1840–1912)
 Georges de Tribolet (Switzerland, 1830-1873)
 Ronald Pearson Tripp (England, 1914-2001)
 Gustaf Troedsson (Sweden, 1891-1954)
 Joseph Tyrrell (Canada, 1858-1957)

U
 Viktor Uhlig (Austria, 1857-1911)
 Edward Oscar Ulrich (United States, 1857-1944)
 Franz Unger (Austria, 1800-1870)

V
 Pierre-Joseph van Beneden (Belgium, 1809-1894)
 Gerard Frederick van Tets (England / Canada / Australia, 1929-1995)
 Blaire Van Valkenburgh (United States)
 Trevor Valle (United States, 1975- )
 Geerat J. Vermeij (Netherlands / United States, 1946- )
 Édouard de Verneuil (France, 1805-1873)
 Patricia Vickers-Rich (United States / Australia, 1944- )
 Emily H. Vokes (United States, 1930- )
 Alexander von Volborth (Russia, 1800-1876)
 Giovanni Serafino Volta (Italy, 1764-1842)
 Elisabeth Vrba (United States, 1942- )
 Vishnu-Mittre (India, 1924-1991)

W

 Charles Wachsmuth (United States, 1829-1896)
 C. H. Waddington (England, 1905-1975)
 Mary Wade (Australia, 1928-2005)
 Peter J. Wagner (United States, 1964- )
 Norman Arthur Wakefield (Australia, 1918-1972)
 Charles Doolittle Walcott (United States, 1850-1927)
 Alick Walker (England, 1925-1999)
 Cyril Walker (England, 1939-2009)
 Arthur Bache Walkom (Australia, 1889-1976)
 Xiaoming Wang (China / United States)
 Wang Yuan (China)
 Jindřich Wankel (Czech Republic, 1821-1897)
 David Ward (England, 1948- )
 Peter Ward (United States, 1949- )
 Matt J. Wedel (United States)
 Wesley Wehr (United States, 1929-2004)
 David B. Weishampel (United States, 1952- )
 Samuel Paul Welles (United States, 1907-1997)
 John W. Wells (United States, 1907-1994)
 Lars Werdelin (Sweden, 1955- )
 Richard Gilbert West (England, 1926-2020)
 Charles M. Wheatley (United States, 1822-1882)
 Charles Abiathar White (United States, 1826-1910)
 Joseph Frederick Whiteaves (England / Canada, 1835-1909)
 Harry B. Whittington (England, 1916-2010)
 Christopher H. Whittle (United States, 1959- )
 Joan Wiffen (New Zealand, 1922-2009)
 Paul Wignall (England, 1964- )
 James Steele Williams (United States, 1896-1957)
 Samuel Wendell Williston (United States, 1851-1918)
 Alice Wilson (Canada, 1881-1964)
 Jeffrey A. Wilson (United States)
 Carl Wiman (Sweden, 1867-1944)
 Tiberius Cornelis Winkler (Netherlands, 1822-1897)
 Henry Witham (England, 1779-1844)
 Lawrence Witmer (United States)
 Mark P. Witton (England)
 Jack A. Wolfe (United States, 1936-2005)
 Searles Valentine Wood (England, 1798-1880)
 Henry Woods (England, 1868-1952)
 Arthur Smith Woodward (England, 1864-1944)
 Henry Woodward (England, 1832-1921)
 Amos Henry Worthen (United States, 1813-1888)
 Trevor H. Worthy (New Zealand, 1957- )
 Claud William Wright (England, 1917-2010)
 Thomas Wright (Scotland, 1809-1884)
 Andre Wyss (United States)

X
 Xu Xing (China)

Y
 Yang Zhongjian (China, 1897-1979)
 Lorenzo Gordin Yates (United States, 1837-1909)
 Ivan Yefremov (Russia, 1908-1972)
 Xiaobo Yu (China)

Z
 Mikhail Zalessky (Russia, 1877-1946)
 Lindsay Zanno (United States)
 Otto Zdansky (Austria, 1894-1988)
 Charles René Zeiller (France, 1847-1915)
 Zhao Xijin (China)
 Vladimir Zherikhin (Russia)
 Zhou Ming-Zhen (China, 1918-1996)
 Zhou Zhonghe (China, 1965- )
 Jiri Zidek (Czech Republic / United States)
 Eduard Meine van Zinderen-Bakker (Netherlands / South Africa, 1907-2002)

See also
 List of geologists

Lists of biologists by field
Paleontology lists
History of paleontology
Geology-related lists